The Local Computer Networks Conference (LCN) is an annual international academic conference organized by the IEEE Computer Society. The first LCN was held in 1976, with the full name of "Conference on Experiments in New Approaches to Local Computer Networking". The second meeting in 1977 was called the "Conference on 'A Second Look at Local Computer Networking'" before it changed its name to "Third Conference on Local Computer Networks" in 1978. After that the conference was simply called LCN. The IEEE Technical Committee on Computer Communications has sponsored the LCN since 1979.

LCN has grown to be a premier conference on theoretical and practical aspects of computer networking and is ranked as an A conference according to the CORE Rankings Portal in 2017.

History of the Conference

Historical Events 

The conference celebrated its 40th anniversary 2015 in Clearwater Beach, Florida where Robert Metcalfe (founder of 3COM and co-inventor of the Ethernet network technology) gave the keynote speech  and held a panel session with Harvey Freeman (President of the IEEE Communications Society 2017), Howard Salwen ("father of the token ring" and founder of Proteon), and Peter Martini (Director of Institute Fraunhofer FKIE).

References 

Telecommunication conferences
IEEE conferences
Computer networking conferences